Annemieke (or Annemiek) is a Dutch feminine given name. Like Annemarie, it is a combination of the names Anna and Maria, via the hypocorism Mieke. People with the names include:

Annemiek
Anna Mieke Bishop (born 1990), Irish musician
Annemiek Bekkering (born 1991), Dutch competitive sailor
Annemiek Derckx (born 1954), Dutch sprint canoer
Annemiek de Haan (born 1981), Dutch rower
Annemiek Padt-Jansen (1921–2007), Dutch harpist and politician
Annemiek van Vleuten (born 1982), Dutch road cyclist
Annemieke
Annemieke Bes (born 1978), Dutch competitive sailor
 (born 1982), Dutch musical theater performer
Annemieke Fokke (born 1967), Dutch field hockey player
Annemieke Kiesel (born 1979), Dutch footballer
Annemieke Mein (born 1978), Dutch-born Australian textile artist
Annemieke Ruigrok (born 1959), Dutch ambassador to Australia, Hong Kong, etc.
Annemieke Schollaardt (born 1979), Dutch DJ and radio personality
Annemieke Verdoorn (born 1961), Dutch actress

See also
Annemie, a Dutch windmill

Dutch feminine given names